Pittsburgh shooting may refer to:

 2009 shooting of Pittsburgh police officers, in which three officers were killed
 2018 Pittsburgh synagogue shooting, in which eleven people were killed
 2022 Pittsburgh shooting, in which two people were killed

See also
 Mass shootings in Pennsylvania